Guangweicaris is an extinct genus of fuxianhuiid arthropod known from the Cambrian period. It is only known from the type species Guangweicaris spinatus, which is known from the Cambrian Stage 4 Guanshan Biota near Kunming. It is currently the latest known fuxianhuiid. It was first described in 2007, and was given a comprehensive re-description in 2020. It is currently known from over 150 specimens. Within the fuxianhuiids it is sister to Fuxianhuia, together forming the clade Fuxianhuiidae. In comparison to Fuxianhuia it has a wide, oval shaped opisthothorax and a proportionally longer, narrow tail-like abdomen, with 3 prothoracic tergites, 5 opisthothoracic tergites and 7 abdominal tergites, it also possesses a row of spines running down the central axis of the body from the second opisthothoracic tergite.

Phylogeny 

From

References 

Cambrian animals of Asia
Cambrian arthropods
Cambrian genus extinctions